Demoniac were a heavy metal band from New Zealand formed in Wellington in 1993 by singer and bass player Lindsay Dawson, guitarist Sam Totman and Drummer Steve Francis.  They later moved to London, UK.  Three of the members went on to form DragonForce. Their rather unusual musical style has often been labeled as "blackened power metal".

Biography
The group began playing black metal with Dawson and Totman adopting the stage names "Behemoth" and "Heimdall" as well as the genre's defining trappings and symbolism such as corpse paint. The following year the band was joined by The Magus on keyboards and drummer Mark Hamill from the avant-garde rock band Head Like a Hole. This line-up produced the band's first album Prepare for War, after which Magus left Demoniac and was replaced on keyboards by MC Magnus, reportedly The Magus's brother

Demoniac's next album was 1996's Stormblade that featured a slightly more melodic and catchier black metal style as well as controversial tracks like "Hatred is Purity" and "Niggerslut". During a 2014 interview with Noisey, Totman was asked to explain what appeared to be a White Power and homophobic slant to some of Demoniac's lyrics on songs such as these. Totman said that none of the songs were serious and were written ironically, and that the members were just "having a laugh".

Following Stormblade the band signed to French label Osmose Productions and toured throughout western Europe on the World Domination Tour with Dark Tranquillity, Enslaved and several other bands. At this point Dawson and Totman decided to remain in England and Hamill departed the line-up.

During July 1998 Hong Kong-born guitarist Herman Li joined Demoniac and in October drummer Matej Satanc was recruited. The band began developing a high-speed melodic power metal style, dispensing with the black metal trappings and ideologies. In January 1999 Demoniac headed into the studio with Cradle of Filth producer Mags to record The Fire and the Wind. The original cover featured a black and white photograph of one of the band members drinking while having sex and pointing the middle finger, but it was subsequently banned; the final release artwork was heavily censored, although depicted the same image.

While Dawson had played bass on all the band's recordings, the decision was made to then hire a bass player to allow him extra freedom during live performance. Diccon Harper, formerly of South African death metal band Voice of Destruction then joined Demoniac. Before the end of the year, however, Demoniac had come to an end. All members except Dawson formed DragonHeart, which later became known as DragonForce.

In 2012, the band re-released Prepare For War, with new cover art and an additional track, Throne of Fire. Dawson was the only original member to play on this track, however, as the instruments were provided by New Zealand black metal band Bulletbelt, who feature Demoniac's original drummer, Steve Francis.

Dawson later appeared as a guest in the 2006 album Inhuman Rampage by DragonForce. Steve Francis, the original drummer also appeared as a guest on backing vocals in the 2019 album Extreme Power Metal.

Line-up
Lindsay "Behemoth" Dawson - vocals, bass (1993–1999)
Sam "Heimdall" Totman - guitars (1993–1999), keyboards (1996–1999)
Herman "Shred" Li - guitars (1998–1999)
Matej Satanc - drums (1998–1999)
Diccon Harper - bass (1999)

Past members
"The Magnus" - keyboards (1994)
Mark "Adramolech" Hamill - drums (1994–1996)
Steve Francis - drums (1993–1994)
James "FreekN" Jude - drums (1996–1998)

Discography

Demos
Rehearsal '93, 1993
The Birth of Diabolic Blood, 1994

Full-lengths
Prepare for War, 1994
Stormblade, 1996 
The Fire and the Wind, 1999

EPs and Singles
Moonblood, 1994
Demons of the Night EP, 1999

References

External links
 Official website (offline)

Musical groups established in 1993
Musical groups disestablished in 1999
New Zealand black metal musical groups
Power metal musical groups
1993 establishments in New Zealand